Moreno is a Spanish, Portuguese, Catalan, French, and occasionally, an Italian      surname.
It may refer to:

Arts and entertainment
 Alma Moreno (born 1959), Filipina actress
 Antonio Moreno (1887–1967), American actor and film director, originally from Spain
 Belita Moreno (born 1949), Mexican-American actress
 Carlos Buddy Moreno (1912–2015), American vocalist and bandleader of the 1940s
 Catalina Sandino Moreno (born 1981), Colombian actress
 Chino Moreno (born 1973), American singer and musician
 Claudia Moreno (born 1977), Venezuelan beauty-pageant title holder
 Darío Moreno (1921–1968), Turkish pop singer
 Federico Moreno Torroba (1891–1982), Spanish composer
 Gaby Moreno (born 1981), Guatemalan singer, songwriter and guitarist
 German Moreno (1933–2016), Filipino TV host, talent manager, actor, and comedian.
 Helena Moreno (actress), (born 1989), Angolan actress
 Juan Moreno y Herrera–Jiménez (born 1948), French actor of Spanish origin, better known as Jean Reno
 Jorge Moreno (born 1975), Grammy-winning Cuban-American singer
 José Elías Moreno (1910–1969), Mexican character actor
 José María Moreno (born 1951), Spanish poet, translator and teacher
 Joyce Moreno (musician) (born 1948), Brazilian singer/songwriter, guitarist and arranger
 Leticia Moreno (born 1985), Spanish violinist
 Marguerite Moreno (1871–1948), French actress
 María José Moreno (born 1967), Spanish soprano
 Mario Moreno (1911–1993), Mexican comedian/actor better known as Cantinflas
 Miguel Moreno (1596–1655), Spanish poet
 Nicolás Moreno (artist) (1923–2012), Mexican landscape painter
 Pepe Moreno (born 1954), Spanish comic book artist and writer
 Pitoy Moreno (1925-2018), Filipino fashion designer
 Rita Moreno (born 1931), Puerto Rican actress, dancer and singer
 Rodrigo Moreno (born 1972), Argentine film director and screenwriter
 Ruby Moreno (born 1965), Filipino film actress

Military and police
 Arturo Durazo Moreno (1924–2000), chief of police of Mexico City 1976 to 1982
 Bonaventura Moreno, rear admiral of the Spanish Navy
 Emmanuel Moreno (1971–2006), Israeli lieutenant colonel

Politics
 Alberto Moreno (politician) (born 1941), Peruvian politician
 Carlos Moreno de Caro (born 1946), Colombian conservative politician, ambassador to South Africa
 Celso Cesare Moreno (1830-1901), Italian sea captain, traveller, political activist and writer
 Denise Moreno Ducheny (born 1952), American politician
 Gabriel García Moreno (1821–1875), former President of Ecuador
 Helena Moreno (born 1977), United States journalist and politician
 Isko Moreno (born 1974), Filipino TV actor and current mayor of the city of Manila
 Javier Moreno (politician) (born 1965), Spanish politician and Member of the European Parliament
 Julio Enrique Moreno (1879–1952), former President of Ecuador
 Lenín Moreno (born 1953), President of Ecuador
 Luis Alberto Moreno (born 1953), Colombian diplomat and journalist, president of the Inter-American Development Bank
 María de los Ángeles Moreno (1945–2019), Mexican politician
 Mariano Moreno (1778–1811), Argentine lawyer, journalist and politician
 Mario Anguiano Moreno (born 1962), Mexican politician, member of the Institutional Revolutionary Party
 Maurizio Moreno (1940-2016), Italian diplomat; former ambassador to Senegal and Czechoslovakia; president, International Institute of Humanitarian Law, 2007
 Nahuel Moreno (Hugo Bressano, 1924–1987), Argentine politician
 Paul Moreno (1931-2017), American politician
 Proco Joe Moreno (born 1972), American politician

Science and learning
 Carlos J. Moreno, Colombian mathematician
 Francisco Moreno (1852–1919), Argentine explorer and academic commonly called Perito Moreno 
 Hugo Moreno Roa, Chilean volcanologist
 Jacob L. Moreno (1889–1974), Austro-Romanian psychotherapist, founder of psychodrama
 José Luis Ortiz Moreno, Spanish astronomer
 José Miguel Moreno (born 1946), Spanish specialist of historical plucked string instruments
 Óscar Moreno (1878–1971), Portuguese urologist

Sports
 Agustín Moreno (born 1967), Mexican former tennis player
 Alberto Moreno (born 1992), Spanish footballer
 Alberto Ortiz Moreno (born 1985), Spanish footballer
 Alejandro Moreno (born 1979), Venezuelan footballer
 Alfredo Moreno (1980–2021), Argentine footballer
 Arte Moreno (born 1946), owner of the Anaheim Angels baseball team
 Brandon Moreno (born 1993), Mexican flyweight mixed martial arts fighter 
 Byron Moreno (born 1969), Ecuadorian football referee
 Carla Moreno (born 1976), Brazilian triathlon athlete
 Carlos Alfaro Moreno (born 1964), Argentine former footballer
 Carlos Bernardo Moreno (born 1967), Chilean sprinter
 Daniel Moreno (born 1981), Spanish road racing cyclist
 Dayro Moreno (born 1985), Colombian footballer
 Frank Moreno (born 1965), Cuban judoka
 Gabriel Moreno (born 2000), Venezuelan baseball player
 Gerard Moreno (born 1992), Spanish footballer
 Giovanni Moreno (born 1986), Colombian footballer
 Héctor Moreno (born 1988), Mexican footballer
 Héctor Moreno (racewalker)  (born 1963), Colombian retired racewalker
 Henry Moreno (1930–2007), American jockey
 Jaime Moreno (born 1974), Bolivian footballer
 Javier Moreno (cyclist) (born 1984), Spanish racing cyclist
 Joaquín Moreno (born 1973), Mexican football manager
 Jorge Andújar Moreno (born 1987), Spanish footballer known as "Coke"
 José Manuel Moreno (1916–1978), Argentine footballer
 José Manuel Moreno (cyclist) (born 1969), Spanish cyclist and Olympic champion
 José Moreno Mora (born 1981), Colombian footballer
 José Moreno (baseball) (1957–2019), former Major League Baseball infielder and current minor league manager
 José Moreno (tennis), Spanish former tennis player
 Joyce Moreno (footballer) (born 1974), Spanish footballer
 Juan Gutiérrez Moreno (born 1976), Spanish footballer
 Juan Moreno (pitcher) (born 1975), Venezuelan baseball player
 Julio Moreno (baseball) (1921–1987), Cuban-born professional baseball player
 Julio Moreno (fencer), Chilean Olympic fencer
 Julio Alberto Moreno (born 1958), Spanish former footballer
 Julio César Moreno (born 1969), Chilean football coach
 Karla Moreno (born 1988), Nicaraguan weightlifter
 Katerine Moreno (born 1974), Bolivian swimmer
 Knowshon Moreno (born 1987), American football running back
 Luis Moreno (footballer), Panamanian footballer
 Luis Antonio Moreno, retired Colombian footballer
 Marcelo Martins Moreno, Bolivian footballer
 Marlos Moreno (born 1996), Colombian footballer
 Moses Moreno (born 1975), American football quarterback
 Nicolás Moreno (footballer, born 1928), Argentine footballer
 Nicolás Moreno (footballer, born 1994), Argentine footballer
 Nuria Moreno (born 1975), Spanish field hockey player
 Omar Moreno (born 1952), Major League Baseball outfielder born in Panama
 Orber Moreno (born 1977), Venezuelan baseball player
 Pichichi (footballer) (1892–1922), Spanish footballer born Rafael Moreno Aranzadi
 Ricardo Moreno (1937-2008), Mexican featherweight boxer
 Robeiro Moreno (born 1969), Colombian football defender
 Roberto Moreno (born 1959), Brazilian Formula One driver
 Rodrigo (footballer, born 1991), Spanish footballer
 Rodrigo Moreno (athlete) (born 1966), Colombian race walker
 Rossy Moreno (born 1965), Mexican wrestler
 Sebastián Moreno (born 1992), Salvadoran tennis player
 Sergio Moreno (footballer, born 1992), Panamanian footballer
 Toñi Moreno (born 1973), Spanish journalist and presenter
 Tressor Moreno (born 1979), Colombian footballer
 Vicente Moreno (born 1974), Spanish football manager
 Víctor Moreno (born 1979), American baseball pitcher
 Víctor Moreno (cyclist) (born 1985), Venezuelan road cyclist
 Walter José Moreno (born 1978), Colombian footballer
 Yipsi Moreno (born 1980), Cuban hammer thrower
 Zeke Moreno (born 1978), American football player

Other
 Carlos R. Moreno, Associate justice of the Supreme Court of California
 Consuelo Moreno-López (1893–2004), Spanish supercentenarian
 Eliseo Moreno (1959–1987), American murderer
 Ezequiél Moreno y Díaz (1848–1906), member of the Order of Augustinian Recollects, now venerated as a saint in the Roman Catholic Church
 Francisco Moreno (bishop) (born 1950), Anglican Archbishop of Mexico
 Glen Moreno (born 1943), American businessman
 Luis Moreno Ocampo (born 1952), Argentine jurist, chief prosecutor for the International Criminal Court

See also
 Moreni (surname)
 Moreno (given name)
 Moreno (disambiguation)
 Morena (disambiguation)
 Zew Wawa Morejno (1916–2011), Polish chief rabbi

Portuguese-language surnames
Spanish-language surnames
Sephardic surnames
Surnames of Colombian origin